Harold "Hal" Erickson (born 1950) is a media historian who was a senior editor at AllRovi for 15 years starting in 1994 when it was known as "All Movies".

Biography
He received a bachelor's degree in acting and directing from the University of Wisconsin-Milwaukee and a master's degree in theater history at the University of North Carolina at Chapel Hill. He has also written several books relating to the history of movies and television as well as many media articles for Encyclopædia Britannica. He lives in Milwaukee, Wisconsin.

Books 

 Two volumes.
Military Comedy Films: a Critical Survey and Filmography of Hollywood Releases since 1918, Jefferson, N.C.: McFarland & Co. Publishers, 2012,  
The Baseball Filmography, 1915 through 2001, Jefferson, N.C. : McFarland, 2002,   
Encyclopedia of Television Law Shows: Factual and Fictional Series About Judges, Lawyers and the Courtroom, 1948-2008, Jefferson, N.C.: McFarland, 2009,  
"From Beautiful Downtown Burbank": a Critical History of Rowan & Martin's Laugh-In, 1968-1973, Jefferson, N.C.: McFarland & Co., 2009,  
Sid and Marty Krofft: a Critical Study of Saturday Morning Children’s Television, 1969-1993, Jefferson, N.C.: McFarland, 2007, 
Religious Radio and Television in the United States, 1921-1991: the Programs and Personalities, Jefferson, N.C.: McFarland, 1992,  
Baseball in the Movies: a Comprehensive Reference, 1915-1991, Jefferson, N.C.: McFarland, 1992,  
Syndicated Television: the First Forty Years, 1947-1987, Jefferson, N.C.: McFarland, 1989,

References 

21st-century American historians
American male non-fiction writers
Living people
1950 births
21st-century American male writers